Tabulaephorus narynus is a moth of the family Pterophoridae. It is found in Kyrgyzstan, Tajikistan, and Uzbekistan. It occurs at high altitudes. Specimens have been found in July and August.

References

Moths described in 1993
Pterophorini